Sultanuddin Ahmed is an engineer who was killed in the Bangladesh Liberation war and is considered a martyr in Bangladesh.

Early life
Ahmed was born in Sarkarpara, Brahmanbaria District in 1935. He graduated from Chandpur High School in 1950 and graduated from Dhaka Ahsanullah Engineering College in 1959 with BSc in engineering. He graduated from Oklahoma State University with a MS degree in technical education.

Career
Ahmed joined the Dhaka Polytechnic Institute in 1959 as an instructor. He was promoted in 1965 to principal and transferred to Faridpur Technical Institute. He went to the United States for further studies, and returned in March 1968 to join the Jessore Polytechnic Institute as principal.

Death
On 25 March 1971, with the start of Operation Searchlight and Bangladesh Liberation war, his house was attacked by Pakistan Army. He was killed along with his male relatives present in his house.

References

1935 births
1971 deaths
People from Brahmanbaria district
Bangladesh University of Engineering and Technology alumni
Oklahoma State University alumni
People killed in the Bangladesh Liberation War